"Let 'Em In" is a song by Wings from their 1976 album Wings at the Speed of Sound. It was written and sung by Paul McCartney and reached the top 3 in the United Kingdom, the United States and Canada. It was a No. 2 hit in the UK; in the U.S. it was a No. 3 pop hit and No. 1 easy listening hit. In Canada, the song was No. 3 for three weeks on the pop chart and No. 1 for three weeks on the MOR chart of RPM magazine. The single was certified Gold by the Recording Industry Association of America for sales of over one million copies. It can also be found on McCartney's 1987 compilation album, All the Best!   A demo of the song, featuring Denny Laine on lead vocal, was included as a bonus track on the Archive Collection reissue of Wings at the Speed of Sound.

Content 
The song starts with the sound of a vibraphone mimicking the Friedland Westminster Chime Doorbell before the rhythm begins. The lyric namechecks several famous people, between friends and relatives of McCartney who, without a justified reason, knock on the door or ring the bell of his house and he exclaims "Let 'Em In". They include McCartney's paternal aunt Gin, his brother Michael, and Linda McCartney's brother John. Phil and Don of the Everly Brothers are named (the duo had a hit with "Keep A Knockin'"), along with Martin Luther, who famously hung his "95 Theses" on a church door. An Uncle Ernie is also named, being the character Ringo Starr sang in the London Symphony Orchestra's recording of the Who's rock opera, Tommy.

"Let 'Em In" is also notable for the false fade out, which, however, becomes loud for the last two notes of the song. The song makes use of the piano, drums, brass, including a trombone solo, and wind instruments, featuring flutes, as well as backup vocals from Linda and other members of Wings.

The 7 inch single version is an edit of the album version. The UK and US pressings of this edit are alike.

Reception
Cash Box said that it was a "better, more substantial tune [than 'Silly Love Songs'"] and that "McCartney's voice is at its best, and the rhythm of this one is dangerously addictive." Record World said that "with a loping beat and a brisk military drum sound, this should be another chapter in McCartney's success story."

Personnel
 Paul McCartney – vocals, piano, backing vocals
 Jimmy McCulloch – bass
 Denny Laine – backing vocals, military drums
 Joe English – drums
 Linda McCartney – backing vocals
 Howie Casey, Thaddeus Richard, Steve Howard, Tony Dorsey – flutes, horns
 unknown – vibraphone

All personnel according to The Paul McCartney Project, a website consisting of songs with involvement by Paul.

Release
The song was released worldwide as a 7" single, except in France where it was released as 12" single (the first-ever McCartney 12") with both sides labelled "Special Disco Mix".

It was included on the compilation album Wings Greatest (1978), as well as the Paul McCartney compilation albums All the Best! (1987), Wingspan: Hits and History (2001) and Pure McCartney (2016).

Track listings
 7" single (R 6015)
 "Let 'Em In" – 3:42
 "Beware My Love" – 6:05

 12" single (2C 052-98.062 y)
 "Let 'Em In" (Special Disco Mix) – 5:08
 "Beware My Love" (Special Disco Mix) – 6:05
A Released in France only.

Chart performance

Weekly charts

Year-end charts

Certifications

Cover versions
 During the 1976 Miss America pageant, MC Bert Parks performed a memorable rendition of the song.
 The song was covered in 1977 by Billy Paul, substituting a list of notable African-American figures such as Malcolm X and Louis Armstrong in lieu of the people named in the original. This version reached No. 91 on the Billboard Soul chart, and No. 26 on the UK charts.
 "Guess Who's Knockin'", a song written by Prince and released by The New Power Generation on initial pressings of the 1993 Goldnigga album, references "Let 'Em In" without credit.
 Ringo Starr used lyrics from "Let 'Em In" in 2003 on "English Garden" from Ringo Rama.

See also
List of number-one adult contemporary singles of 1976 (U.S.)

References

External links
 

1976 songs
1976 singles
Capitol Records singles
Cashbox number-one singles
Music published by MPL Music Publishing
Paul McCartney songs
Songs written by Linda McCartney
Songs written by Paul McCartney
Song recordings produced by Paul McCartney
Billy Paul songs
Paul McCartney and Wings songs